Leonard Cecil Ludbrooke (9 November 1894 – 4 July 1968) was an Australian rules footballer who played with Collingwood in the Victorian Football League (VFL).

Notes

External links 

Len Ludbrooke's profile at Collingwood Forever

1894 births
1968 deaths
Australian rules footballers from Melbourne
Collingwood Football Club players
People from South Melbourne